New Jersey's 35th Legislative District is one of 40 districts that make up the map for the New Jersey Legislature. It encompasses the Bergen County municipalities of Elmwood Park and Garfield and the Passaic County municipalities of Haledon, North Haledon, Paterson, and Prospect Park.

Demographic information
As of the 2020 United States census, the district had a population of 238,160, of whom 179,831 (75.5%) were of voting age. The racial makeup of the district was 64,563 (27.1%) White, 46,103 (19.4%) African American, 2,962 (1.2%) Native American, 12,901 (5.4%) Asian, 96 (0.0%) Pacific Islander, 79,289 (33.3%) from some other race, and 32,246 (13.5%) from two or more races. Hispanic or Latino of any race were 126,899 (53.3%) of the population.

The district had 137,033 registered voters , of whom 52,296 (38.2%) were registered as unaffiliated, 66,290 (48.4%) were registered as Democrats, 15,843 (11.6%) were registered as Republicans, and 2,604 (1.9%) were registered to other parties.

Political representation
For the 2022–2023 session, the district is represented in the State Senate by Nellie Pou (D, North Haledon) and in the General Assembly by Shavonda E. Sumter (D, Paterson) and Benjie E. Wimberly (D, Paterson).

The legislative district is located entirely within New Jersey's 9th congressional district congressional district.

Apportionment history
The 35th District has always been based around Paterson since its creation in 1973. The 1973 through 1981 version of the district included Paterson, Prospect Park, Hawthorne, and North Haledon. A slight shift in the district occurred in the 1981 redistricting when North Haledon was removed, and Haledon and Elmwood Park were added. West Paterson was added and North Haledon was re-added to the district in the 1991 redistricting. In the 2001 redistricting, West Paterson swapped places with Totowa and Bergen County borough Glen Rock was added.

Election history

Election results

Senate

General Assembly

References

Bergen County, New Jersey
Passaic County, New Jersey
35